"The Family of Man" is a song written by Paul Williams and Jack Conrad, produced by Richard Podolor. It was most famously performed by Three Dog Night and featured on their 1971 album, Harmony.

In the US, "The Family of Man" reached #12 on the Hot 100 and #27 on the U.S. adult contemporary chart. Outside of the US, "The Family of Man" peaked at #5 in Canada.

Personnel
Michael Allsup – guitar
Jimmy Greenspoon – keyboards
Danny Hutton – lead vocals (first verse), background vocals
Chuck Negron – lead vocals (2nd verse and fade out), background vocals 
Joe Schermie – bass
Floyd Sneed – drums
Cory Wells – lead vocals (3rd verse), background vocals

Other versions
Williams released a version of the song on his 1974 album, A Little Bit of Love.

References

1971 songs
1972 singles
Songs written by Paul Williams (songwriter)
Three Dog Night songs
Dunhill Records singles
Songs written by Jack Conrad